Stephen Joseph Hardin (October 27, 1946 – June 28, 2015) was an American songwriter, keyboardist, and harmonica and clavinet player.  He was probably best known as the writer of top-ten country hits "I Love My Truck" (#10, Glen Campbell) and "Breakin' Down" (#10, Waylon Jennings), although his diverse career included performing tours with Point Blank, Glen Campbell and Steppenwolf; a seven-year gig in a south Florida Reggae band; and a solo CD with backup vocals by Gretchen Wilson.

History 
Hardin played in bands in Dallas, Oklahoma City and Tulsa in the late 1960s and early 1970s before joining Point Blank as a keyboard man in 1977.  The band's next album release, Airplay, including his composition "Mean to Your Queenie", which would become the band's trademark concert theme song.

Hardin met John Kay when Steppenwolf was opening for Point Blank in a venue in west Texas, and Kay offered Hardin a keyboard job with Steppenwolf.  Hardin accepted, and spent the rest of the year touring with the band.

While back in L.A. with Steppenwolf, Hardin learned that Glen Campbell was wanting to hire a full-time writer for his records, tours, and T.V. performances.  He interviewed, got the job, and spent the next five years working with Campbell writing songs (using the name Joe Rainey), touring, and performing on The Glen Campbell Music Show.

After working with Campbell, Hardin started hanging out at Nashville's Hall of Fame Club, and he met and married Tulsa country music singer Gus Hardin.  He stayed with Gus and her band for about a year before striking out for south Florida, where he spent the next seven years playing Reggae. From there he moved on to Nashville's Bourbon Street Blues and Boogie Bar, where he was the keyboardist for Stacy Mitchhart and Blues-U-Can-Use.

Hardin passed away on June 28, 2015.

Albums/CDs 
 Point Blank - "Airplay"
 2 albums w/Tanya Tucker
 3 albums w/Glen Campbell
 "Cheryl Dilcher" album w/ Lowell George
 "Rhythmgypsy" solo album

Original songs

References
 
 The Current (www.currentland.com) - Vol. 7, No. 8, August 2010
 Nashville Music Networking - Issue 11, August 1996

1946 births
2015 deaths
American male songwriters
American keyboardists